Raikod is a village in Medak district of the Indian state of Telangana.

Villages in Medak district